A women's Twenty20 cricket tournament at the 2019 Pacific Games in Apia, Samoa, was held from 8 to 13 July 2019 at the Faleata Oval Grounds. Following the International Cricket Council's decision to grant T20I status to all women's matches played between Associate Members after 1 July 2018, matches were eligible for Twenty20 International (T20I) status subject to both teams being members of the ICC and players passing eligibility criteria.

The team's involved in the women's tournament were the host nation Samoa, Fiji, Papua New Guinea and Vanuatu. Samoa defeated Papua New Guinea by 4 wickets in the final to win the gold medal, while Vanuatu took bronze.

Round-robin stage

Points Table

Matches

Finals

Bronze medal match

Gold medal match

See also 
 Cricket at the 2019 Pacific Games – Men's tournament

References

External links
 Series home at ESPN Cricinfo

Pacific Games, women
Cricket at the 2019 Pacific Games
International cricket competitions in Samoa